Aculithus is a genus of araneomorph spiders in the family Phrurolithidae. It was first described by Ke-Ke Liu & Shuqiang Li in 2022.

Species 
, it contains seven species:

 Aculithus bijiashanicus (Liu, 2020) (type) — China
 Aculithus chongyi Liu & S. Q. Li, 2022 — China
 Aculithus fabiformis (Liu, Xu, Xiao, Yin & Peng, 2019) — China
 Aculithus hippocampus (Jin, Fu, Yin & Zhang, 2016) — China
 Aculithus subfabiformis (Liu, 2020) — China
 Aculithus taishan Liu & S. Q. Li, 2022 — China
 Aculithus xunwu Liu & S. Q. Li, 2022 — China

References 

Phrurolithidae genera
Spiders of Asia
Phrurolithidae